Xyrichtys sanctaehelenae, the yellow razorfish, is a species of marine ray-finned fish from the family Labridae, the wrasses. The fish is found in the Central Atlantic Ocean.  

Etymology
The fish is named in honor of the island of St. Helens in the Atlantic.

References

sanctaehelenae
Taxa named by Albert Günther
Fish described in 1868